James Michael Davies (born 27 February 1980) is a British Conservative Party politician serving as the Member of Parliament (MP) for the Vale of Clwyd since 2019, having previously held the seat from 2015 to 2017. He has been serving as Parliamentary Under-Secretary of State for Wales since October 2022.

Early life and career
Davies was born in St Asaph in his constituency, tracing his lineage there back seven generations. He was educated at the private King's School, Chester before going on to study at Christ's College, Cambridge, gaining three degrees: a BA, a MB BChir in 2004, and an MA in 2005. He is a Member of the Royal College of General Practitioners, specialising in dementia. Davies was elected to Denbighshire County Council in 2004, remaining a member until 2015. He represented the Prestatyn East ward. He was on the party list in North Wales at the 2007 National Assembly for Wales election.

Parliamentary career
At the 2015 general election, he was elected as the Member of Parliament (MP) for Vale of Clwyd with 39% of the vote, ahead of incumbent Chris Ruane of Labour on 38.4%. Ruane had held the seat for 18 years, and Davies received 237 more votes than his opponent. He lost his seat at the 2017 United Kingdom general election, but returned to Parliament at the 2019 election.

In September 2020, Davies received criticism on social media for asking Prime Minister Boris Johnson to comment on the news that the 2020 series of I'm A Celebrity...Get Me Out Of Here! would  be filmed in Gwrych Castle in Abergele, North Wales instead of New South Wales Australia, during a Prime Minister's Questions session that was otherwise dominated by question's relating to the government's coronavirus response.

Davies was appointed Parliamentary Private Secretary to the Department of Health and Social Care in September 2021. He resigned this position on 6 July 2022 alongside many other appointments.

Policies and views
In February 2015, Davies expressed concern over plans to scrap Doctor-led maternity care and services for miscarriages and ectopic pregnancies at Ysbyty Glan Clwyd, stating "The 'temporary' arrangements would mean any elective surgery requiring an overnight stay being transferred to Wrexham or Bangor. The same would apply to early pregnancy unit assessments, meaning inconvenience to many women and their families."

Voting record

On the majority of issues Davies casts his votes in line with other Conservative MPs. However, he diverged from party lines on some issues.

Davies voted against investigations into the Iraq War, the majority of his party voted for. 
Davies voted for requiring pub companies to offer pub landlords rent-only leases, most of his party voted against.

He voted to trigger Article 50 before April 2017.

Personal life
Davies married Nina Jones in 2012; they have two young sons.

Outside of politics, he lists his recreations as "travelling, walking, languages, local community regeneration, cinema, real ale and dining out, DIY". He is a member of the Carlton Club.

References

External links
Official website

Profile at the Conservative Party website

1980 births
Living people
21st-century Welsh medical doctors
Alumni of Christ's College, Cambridge
Conservative Party (UK) MPs for Welsh constituencies
People educated at The King's School, Chester
People from St Asaph
UK MPs 2015–2017
UK MPs 2019–present
Welsh Conservative councillors